Merthyr Vale railway station is a railway station serving the villages of Merthyr Vale and Aberfan in Merthyr Tydfil, Wales. It is located on the Merthyr branch of the Merthyr Line. Passenger services are provided by Transport for Wales.

History
Since 2008 the station has had a passing loop installed. This allowed a half-hourly service to be introduced on the branch from the May 2009 timetable change.  Previously (up until 1991) a loop had existed at Black Lion Crossing, a short distance to the south, which also controlled the siding connections into Merthyr Vale Colliery.

The station was first opened by the Taff Vale Railway in 1883. It is briefly shown in Richard Fleischer's 1971 film 10 Rillington Place, starring Richard Attenborough and John Hurt. When Timothy Evans (Hurt) returns to Wales, he is seen walking from the station.

Services
On Sunday, there is a two-hourly service each way to Merthyr & Bridgend.

References

External links 

Photo of the station & passing loop in 2012 (Geograph.org)

Railway stations in Merthyr Tydfil County Borough
DfT Category F2 stations
Former Taff Vale Railway stations
Railway stations in Great Britain opened in 1883
Railway stations served by Transport for Wales Rail